is a Japanese professional boxer in the super flyweight (115 lb) division as well as the WBA super flyweight champion.

Early life 
Nashiro took an interest in boxing during elementary school, when his father took him to a boxing match for the first time. He became a fan of WBC Bantamweight champion Joichiro Tatsuyoshi, and entered his school's track team to build up his stamina. He was finally allowed to begin boxing in high school, and continued to Kinki University, but dropped out to begin his professional career. His brother Yuji Nashiro is a professional kickboxer.

Early career 
Nashiro made his debut in Osaka in July 2003, knocking out his opponent only 32 seconds into the first round. He won three more fights, and fought Hidenobu Honda in August 2004. Honda was a world ranker at the time, and had challenged Pongsaklek Wonjongkam and Alexander Muñoz in world title matches. Nashiro won by 10 round unanimous decision, becoming a world ranker in only his 5th professional fight, and was hailed by boxing fans as one of the top prospects in Japan.

Tragedy 
On April 3, 2005, Nashiro fought Japanese Super flyweight champion Seiji Tanaka. The two had often sparred and trained together, and Nashiro won by TKO in the 10th round, winning the title. However, Tanaka dropped into a coma after the fight, and died two weeks later from a subdural hematoma. Nashiro went into a sort of shock state after Tanaka's death, and seriously contemplated retirement from the guilt he felt. He kept himself away from boxing for over a month, until he met Tanaka's father at Masamori Tokuyama's WBC title defense. Tanaka's father told Nashiro to not worry about what happened to his son, and to continue his boxing career. Nashiro paid a visit to Tanaka's grave in Tottori, Japan, to pay his respects, after defending the title won from Tanaka. Nashiro's struggle was documented on an episode of the Japanese TV show Kiseki Taiken! Unbelievabou! aired on February 22, 2007.

World title 
Nashiro defended his title in November 2005, winning by 10-round decision, and became the top ranked contender in the WBA Super flyweight division. He returned his Japanese Super flyweight title, and fought Martín Castillo in July 2006 for the WBA Super flyweight title. Nashiro won the fight by Martin Castillo having hevnling bleeding in the 10th round, becoming a world champion in only his 8th professional fight. This tied Joichiro Tatsuyoshi's record as the fastest Japanese fighter to become world champion. Nashiro could have beaten the record by challenging the world title in his 7th fight, but defended the Japanese Super flyweight title once to show respect for the deceased Tanaka.

Nashiro made his first defense in December 2006, against Eduardo Garcia of Mexico. Nashiro won by 12 round unanimous decision to retain his title. Garcia had previously been invited to Japan as Nashiro's sparring partner when he was training for his fight against Martín Castillo.

Nashiro fought former WBA super flyweight champion Alexander Muñoz on May 3, 2007, at the Ariake Coliseum in Tokyo, Japan, for his second defense. Muñoz completely overpowered Nashiro, winning the title by unanimous decision. This was the first loss of Nashiro's career.

Title regained 
On September 15, 2008, Nashiro regained the WBA super flyweight title by the split decision victory over fellow Japanese Kohei Kono. Prior to this bout, the title became vacant because Munoz lost it to WBC champion Cristian Mijares who unified it.

He defended that title in an optional defense on April 11, 2009, with TKO victory over fellow-Japanese Konosuke Tomiyama. Although he stopped Tomiyama, Nashiro was downed twice in separate rounds.

On September 30, 2009, Nashiro fought Hugo Cázares to a draw. On May 8, 2010, Nahiro lost the WBA super flyweight title in his rematch against Hugo Cázares.

See also 
List of WBA world champions
List of super flyweight boxing champions
List of Japanese boxing world champions
Boxing in Japan

References 

General references
 Nobuo Nashiro – BoxRec Boxing Encyclopedia
 

1981 births
Super-flyweight boxers
Living people
People from Nara, Nara
World Boxing Association champions
World super-flyweight boxing champions
World boxing champions
Japanese male boxers